Ronan Connolly (born 1999) is an Irish hurler who plays for Limerick Senior Championship club Adare and at inter-county level with the Limerick senior hurling team. He usually lines out as a left corner-back.

Career statistics

Honours

Ardscoil Rís
Dr. Harty Cup (2): 2016, 2018 (c)

Limerick
All-Ireland Senior Hurling Championship (1): 2020
Munster Senior Hurling Championship (3): 2019, 2020, 2021
National Hurling League (2): 2019, 2020

References

1999 births
Living people
UCC hurlers
Adare hurlers
Limerick inter-county hurlers